Benjamin Oliver Anthony Watts (born 19 January 1967) is a British-born photographer based in New York City, whose work has been published in various international fashion magazines, such as Elle, Vogue, Harper's Bazaar, Vanity Fair, and Condé Nast Traveller.

Biography
Watts was brought up in Australia. He is the older brother of actress Naomi Watts and son of Peter Watts, who was initially a road manager for Pink Floyd and later their sound engineer, and was found dead of an apparent heroin overdose in August 1976, aged 30.

Watts studied at the Sydney College of the Arts in Australia, where he started his photographic career as a photographer's assistant.

Career
He first came to New York in 1990, where he started documenting urban youth and was especially fascinated by hip hop culture.  He moved to New York circa 1993. His work was shown in Vibe and Rolling Stone and in advertisements for Nike, Reebok and Gap.

Besides his work for fashion magazines, Watts has shot advertising campaigns for companies such as Polo Ralph Lauren, Kodak, Sony Music and Apple.

Publications 
 Portraits (2000)
 Body and Soul (2001)
 Tattoo Nation (2002)
 Soul Style (2003)
 History of Hip Hop (2003)
 Tomo (2003)
 Big Up (2004)
 Montauk Dreaming (2015)

References

External links 
 
 photographers limited editions - Online Gallery
 Morphizm.com - Interview with Ben Watts about Big Up

1967 births
Photographers from New York City
Living people
Place of birth missing (living people)
Australian photographers